Wu refers to a region in China centered on Lake Tai in Jiangnan (the region south of the Yangtze River). The Wu region was historically part of the ancient Yang Province in southeastern China. The name "Wu" came from the names of several historical kingdoms based in that area.

History
The first Wu state was established in the late Western Zhou dynasty. Once considered to be a vassal state of the Western Zhou dynasty, the Wu state emerged as a major power among the various states in China at the end of the Spring and Autumn period.

The most influential one among the historical Wu kingdoms was the state of Eastern Wu, which existed during the Three Kingdoms period.

In the Han dynasty, the Wu region was mainly under the jurisdiction of Wu Commandery, which was a commandery under the larger Yang Province. Wu Commandery was later converted to Wu Prefecture. In the Sui and Tang dynasties, the names changed several times between Wu and Su and eventually named Su Prefecture (present-day Suzhou) in the year 758.

There was two Wu Prefectures during the Southern and Northern Dynasties period. The Wu Prefecture of the Northern Dynasties was renamed Yang Prefecture (present-day Yangzhou) in the year 589, and around the same time Yang Prefecture was renamed Jiang Prefecture (present-day Nanjing).

Notable cities

Meili
The state of Wu was founded by Taibo and Zhongyong, the first and second son of King Tai of Zhou. Meili (梅里)  was the capital city. The vicinity is now known as Wuxi.

Suzhou
Suzhou was the capital of the Wu state during the Warring States period. Suzhou was also called Wuzhou.

The Wu language and its dialects are spoken in Wu region. The city of Suzhou is located in the core area of Wu region, and the dialect spoken in Suzhou is usually regarded as the most typical Wu language dialect.

Nanjing
The capital of the Eastern Wu state during the Three Kingdoms period was Nanjing, whose names include Jinling, Jianye and Jiankang.

In the Eastern Jin dynasty, Nanjing became the capital of China, for the first time the capital of the Chinese empire moved to southern China. The previous Chungyuan Standard Pronunciation (中原雅音) evolved into the Jinling Standard Pronunciation (金陵雅音) of standard Chinese. Go-on (吳音), which is one of the sources of Japanese pronunciation for Chinese characters (the others being kan-on, tō-on and kan'yō-on), was Jinling Standard Pronunciation, the standard Chinese of time that spread to Japan during Southern dynasties. The Go- component in the name Go-on is cognate to the Chinese word Wu (Wu is the pronunciation for the glyph 吳 in Mandarin. However, in today's Wu language 吳 is usually pronounced as Ho, Oh, Ng, or Nguu).

See also
 Wu culture
 Wu languages
 Wu peoples

References 

 
Regions of China
Jiangnan
Geography of Zhejiang